"Ten Duel Commandments" is the fifteenth song from Act 1 of the musical Hamilton, based on the life of Alexander Hamilton, which premiered on Broadway in 2015. Lin-Manuel Miranda wrote both the music and lyrics to the song.

Synopsis

The song recounts a duel which occurred between John Laurens and Charles Lee. The duel took place as a result of disparaging remarks made by Lee about George Washington following Lee's dismissal from the role of Major General in the Continental Army in the wake of Lee's failure at the Battle of Monmouth. The song starts with the ensemble counting up to nine, then setting out the ten rules involved in a duel of the era, before the seconds in the duel, Alexander Hamilton and Aaron Burr, convene to attempt to make peace. Burr labels duels "dumb and immature", but Hamilton insists that they proceed, with the duel continuing as planned. The song culminates with the ensemble counting up again, much like the one at the start of the song. It results in Laurens non-fatally shooting Lee in the side after Hamilton encourages him to "not throw away his shot", a motif in the show and expression of the time.

Analysis
The eponymous ten commandments refer to the Ten Commandments of the Abrahamic faiths, which guide followers on how to live their lives. Miranda also stated that the concept of ten commandments stemmed from the "Ten Crack Commandments", which served as a guide to illegal acts during the 1990s, as well as being a song by the Notorious B.I.G. This connection is acknowledged in the credits of the 2020 filmed version of Hamilton, which states that elements of "Ten Crack Commandments" are used with permission.

Elizabeth Logan, writing for Huffington Post, stated that the song has a key role in making the audience "comfortable with duels". This becomes important in Act 2 of the musical, where two duels occur in Weehawken, New Jersey. Thus, as per the author, the audience will be on board when "some beloved characters pick up pistols" later on in the musical.

The song receives two reprises at key junctures in the musical: during "Blow Us All Away" when Philip Hamilton and George Eacker are about to duel, and in "The World Was Wide Enough" in the lead-up to the Burr-Hamilton duel. In addition, the counting Leitmotif is heard in a modified form in various songs throughout the show, such as in the first of the "Cabinet Battle" songs, where it is orchestrated in baroque counterpoint, and in "Take a Break", where Phillip and his mother Eliza Hamilton argue over and learn about the correct notes on a piano scale and French counting.

Critical reception
The Young Folks had it ranked 29th among songs in Hamilton.

Huffington Post said that the song was a "club-worthy jam", and Vibe.com said that it contained a "strong percussive beat" with the men involved "exuding dominance".

References

2015 songs
Songs from Hamilton (musical)
Songs written by Lin-Manuel Miranda
Songs written by DJ Premier
Works about dueling